Cnemaspis assamensis, also known as the Assam day gecko, is a species of gecko found in Assam, India.

References
 Das, I. & S. Sengupta 2000 A new species of Cnemaspis (Sauria: Gekkonidae) from Assam, northeastern India. J. South Asian Nat. Hist, 5(1): 17–23.

A
Endemic fauna of India
Fauna of Assam
Reptiles of India
Lizards of Asia
Reptiles described in 2000